Frank Osborne was the mayor of Alameda, California. In 1951 he was the recipient of the first long-distance phone call to use the direct distance dialing telephone facility, dialed by Mayor M. Leslie Denning of Englewood, New Jersey.

References

Mayors of places in California
Possibly living people
History of the telephone